Eini is an extinct variety of Khoekhoe language on the Orange River of South Africa, sometimes listed as a distinct language or mistakenly assumed to be a variety of ǃOra.

Khoe languages
Languages of South Africa
Extinct languages of Africa